Yeka (Amharic: የካ ክፍለ ከተማ) is a district of Addis Ababa, Ethiopia.

Geography
The district is located in northeastern suburb of the city. It borders with the districts of Gullele, Arada, Kirkos and Bole.

List of places
 Abado Project 13
 Adwa Dildiy Condominium
 Ayat Real Estate Development
 Balderas Condominium
 Signal

Admin Level: 11
 Ayat 
 Beg Tera
 Bole Ayat 
 Kara
 Kara Alo
 Kebena
 Kotebe
 Megenagna
 Sunshine Real Estate
 Yedejazmach Alula Irsha

Personalities
Girma Wake (born 1943), businessman

Yeka Project
On 21 May 2022, Prime Minister Abiy Ahmed launched a project known as Yeka Project that aims to clearance of forest and build national palaces, houses, artificial lakes and road infrastructures. Landed on 503 hectares, it is the largest project after the Grand Ethiopian Renaissance Dam (GERD), costing 49 billion ETB funded by the United Arab Emirates. It is now under construction.

References

External links

Districts of Addis Ababa